Alexandrina Chezan (born 29 April 1939) is a Romanian volleyball player. She competed in the women's tournament at the 1964 Summer Olympics.

References

External links
 

1939 births
Living people
Romanian women's volleyball players
Olympic volleyball players of Romania
Volleyball players at the 1964 Summer Olympics
Volleyball players from Bucharest